Dziura is a surname. Notable people with the surname include:

Jen Dziura, American writer, educational humorist, and educator
Jim Dziura, American film director, cinematographer, and editor
 Julie Dziura, Brazilian Linguist, writer, and educator

See also
Dziura Nunatak, a nunatak of Victoria Land, Antarctica